Pondicherry University, also known as PU, (French: Université de Pondichéry) is a central research university located in Kalapet, Pondicherry in Union Territory of Puducherry, India. It was established by an Act of Parliament in 1985 by the Department of Higher Education, Ministry of Education, Government of India. The Vice President of India is the Chancellor along with the Lieutenant Governor of Puducherry acting as the Chief Rector and the President of India is the Visitor of the university. The university is a collegiate university with its jurisdiction spread over the Union Territory of Puducherry located in Tamil Nadu (Pondicherry and Karaikal), Kerala (Mahé) and Andhra Pradesh (Yanam), and Union Territory of Andaman and Nicobar Islands. The vast jurisdiction over three Union Territories namely gives the university a national character. The residents speak  diverse languages such as English, Tamil, French, Telugu, Malayalam, Hindi, Bengali, Oriya and Kannada.

Local skill sets are advanced through several vocational programs such as paramedical courses using the on-site hospital facilities.

Campus
It is accessible from Chennai and Bengaluru.

Hostel facilities are available on the campus for both males and females. Students from distant places will be given preference on a first-come, first-served basis. The university has a hostel for foreign students that can accommodate more than 30 students. Girls are given rent free accommodation. All physically challenged students get free education including free board and lodge in hostels. The university provides free transport off the campus and within the campus.
The university which was B grade for 20 years , took a big leap forward during the period 2007 -2012 the 11 plan when prof J A K Tareen was vice chancellor. It grew by 300% all round including infrastructure, facilities and departments. Over 300 new faculty and 22 new departments were started and new campuses at Karaikal and Andaman. It became A grade and In the first NIRF ranking came to top 11 of Indian universities.Prof Tareen was an acclaimed institution builder.

Organisation and administration

Schools, departments and centres
The entire academic structure was reorganized during the tenure of Prof J. A. K. Tareen, who not only established over 20 new departments but also established new schools with over 80 new programs. The university has 14 schools and 52 departments distributed across Pondicherry and Karaikal campus. Each school is headed by a dean, and each department has its own faculty and supporting staff working under the head of the department. They are also provided with separate buildings which house their laboratories and libraries. The following is the list of the schools, departments and centres:

Subramania Bharathi School of Tamil Language and Literature
 Tamil Language & Literature

School of Management

 Department of Management Studies
 Department of Commerce
 Department of Economics
 Department of Tourism Studies
 Department of Banking Technology
 Department of International Business
Karaikal Campus
 Department of Management
 Department of Commerce
 Department of Computer Science

Ramanujan School of Mathematical Sciences
 Department of Mathematics
 Department of Statistics

School of Engineering & Technology
 Computer Science
 Electronics Engineering
 Centre for Pollution Control & Environmental Engineering
 Coastal Engineering
 Geological Technology

School of Physical, Chemical and Applied Sciences

 Department of Physics
 Department of Chemistry
 Department of Earth Sciences
 Department of Applied Psychology

School of Life Sciences
 Department of Bioinformatics 
 Department of Biotechnology
 Department of Ecology & Environmental Sciences
 Department of Ocean Studies and Marine Biology (Port Blair)
 Department of Food Science & Technology
 Department of Biochemistry & Molecular Biology
 Department of Microbiology

School of Humanities

 English and comparative literature
 French
 Hindi
 Sanskrit
 Philosophy
 Physical Education & Sports

School of Social Sciences and International Studies
 Anthropology
 Archaeology
 History
 Politics and International Studies
 Social Work
 Sociology
 Centre for Women's Studies
 Madanjeet Singh Institute of South Asia Regional Cooperation - Centre for South Asian Studies* 
 Centre for Study of Social Exclusion & Inclusive Policy*
These centres were established during XII plan when Prof J A K Tareen was vice chancellor.

School of Education 
 School of Education
 Centre for Adult and Continuing Education

School of Law

School of Medical Sciences

School of Media & Communication

 Library & Information Science
 Department of Electronic Media and Mass Communication

Madanjeet School of Green Energy Technologies
 Centre for Nano Science & Technology
 Department of  Green Energy Technology

List of affiliated colleges

Achariya Arts and Science College
Dr B R Ambedkar Institute of Technology
Arignar Anna Government Arts College
Avvaiyar Government College for Women
Bharathidasan Government College for Women
Bharathiar Palkalaikoodam
Dr S R K Government Arts College
Idhaya College of Arts and Science for Women
Indira Gandhi College of Arts and Science
Jawaharlal Nehru Rajkeeya Mahavidyalaya
Kanchi Mamunivar Centre for Post Graduate Studies
Mahatma Gandhi Government Arts College, Mahe
Mahatma Gandhi Government College
Perunthalaivar Kamarajar Government Arts College
Rathnavel Subramaniam College of Arts and Science
Saradha Gangadharan College
Tagore Arts College
Tagore Arts College (Annexe)
Villianur College for Women
Dr Ambedkar Government Law College
R V S College of Engineering and Technology
Perunthalaivar Kamarajar Institute of Engineering and Technology
Bharathiar College of Engineering and Technology
Pondicherry Engineering College
Rajiv Gandhi College of Engineering and Technology
Regency Institute of Technology
Sri Venkateshwaraa Medical College Hospital and Research Centre
College of Nursing
Kasturba Gandhi College of Nursing
Mahatma Gandhi Dental College and Hospital
Mahatma Gandhi Medical College & Research Institute
Mother Teresa Institute of Health Sciences
Pondicherry Institute of Medical Sciences
Rajiv Gandhi College of Veterinary Animal Sciences
Regional Medical Research Institute
Vector Control Research Centre (ICMR)
Achariya College of Education
Alpha College of Education
Arutperunchothi Ramalingasamy College of Education
Co-operative College of Education
Don Bosco College of Education and Research Institute
Immaculate College of Education
Krishnasamy College of Education for Women
Mahe Co-operative College of Education
Mother Teresa BEd College
Nehru College of Education
Perunthalaivar Kamarajar College of Education
Pope John Paul II College of Education
Regency College of Education
Senthil College of Education
Sree Narayana College of Education
Tagore Government College of Education
Vasavi College of Education
Venkateswara College of Education
Vivekanandha College of Education
Shri Krishnaa College Of Engineering and Technology, Mannadipet, Puducherry
Sri Manakula Vinayagar Engineering College
Sri Manakula Vinayagar Medical College and Hospital
Manakula Vinayagar Institute of Technology
Sri Manakula Vinayagar Nursing College
Usha Latchumanan College of Education
Venkateswara Teacher Training Institute
Acharya College of Engineering & Technology
Alpha College of Engineering
Sri Ganesh College of Engineering and Technology
Dr S J S Paul Memorial College of Engineering & Technology
Indira Gandhi Medical College
Sree Lakshmi Narayana Institute of Medical Sciences
Pandit Jawaharlal Nehru College of Agriculture and Research Institute

Central Instrumentation Facility

The Central Instrumentation Facility (CIF) was established in the university as the University Science Instrumentation Centre (USIC) in 1992 under the UGC Plan Scheme. It housed three facilities – Mechanical Shop, Glass blowing Shop and Electrical Shop, to provide support in the repair and servicing of scientific equipment. Fabrication of components for experimental setups is undertaken.

The USIC has executed design, development and fabrication works ranging from custom designed sample holders/cells to electronic instrumentation and control modules.

In 2005, the centre was reorganised into Central Instrumentation Facility under the School of Physical, Chemical and Applied Sciences and analytical instruments are added to provide analytical service, in addition to the workshop facilities.

Academics

Function and role
Teaching and research are its primary functions as in other Central Universities. It has 200 affiliated colleges located in Union Territory of Puducherry (Pondicherry in Tamil Nadu, Karaikal in Tamil Nadu, Mahé in Kerala and Yanam in Andhra Pradesh), Union Territory of Lakshadweep, Union Territory of Andaman and Nicobar Islands.

Rankings 

Pondicherry University is ranked 1001-1200 in the world by the Times Higher Education World University Rankings of 2023 and 251–300 in Asia. The QS World University Rankings of 2023 ranked it ranked it 800–1000 in worldwide and 351–400 in Asia. It was ranked 101-151 in India overall by the National Institutional Ranking Framework (NIRF) in 2022 and 68th among universities.

Library

The university library, named after Ananda Ranga Pillai, was established in September 1986 with one deputy librarian and two assistant librarians. It was moved to the present locale as an independent building in July 1990. The Library is renowned for its disabled friendly modern infrastructure (80,000 sq. ft), fully air-conditioned, WIFI enabled, services for the Visually Challenged among the proactive services with RFID technology and 24/7 remote access to a collection of 4.97 lakhs, of which print is 2.22 and 2.7 lakhs of e-resources (e-books, e-journals, e-databases, e-theses, Academic Online Videos, Video Talks etc.)

Student life, clubs & extracurricular activities

PU SHARE-

PU SHARE is a community initiated by a group of students from Pondicherry University to share goodness through charity, in and around the university campus. This organization have been active into volunteering for social causes since 2016. Their major aim is upbringing the children at "Snehalayam" (a standalone orphanage near to the Pondicherry University campus) by helping them in academics as well as their necessities. A few other programmes organised by them include the monthly food donation drive in every month of the academic year, blood donation at nearby hospitals and free tuition classes for kids at the orphanage.

"INSPIRE" is the annual event that aims at promotion as well as fundraiser for the activities of PU SHARE throughout the year.

SPECTRA- Pondicherry University (LGBTQIA+ support organization) 
SPECTRA has been working to increase queer visibility and awareness in the university campus and beyond. It also provides a safe space for LGBTQIA students to share their experiences and discuss issues faced by the community. SPECTRA was founded on 15 August 2014 and has been conducting events ever since. One of the first Campus Pride events in India was organized successfully in 2018 at Pondicherry University by SPECTRA.

Earth Sciences Club of Pondicherry University 
The Earth sciences Club was founded in September 2013. It conducts field trips, screen documentaries, organize debates, quizzes, treasure hunts and so on so forth. It is also involved with organising the annual event "Mrittika" in Department of Earth Sciences.

PUQS (Pondicherry University Quiz Society) 
The students have started the Pondicherry University Quiz Society (PUQS) in June 2012.  The inauguration of PUQS was held on 1 August 2011 in Pondicherry University/Lecture Hall Seminar-I. The event was inaugurated by Director of Education of the Pondicherry University, Prof M Ramadass. The first quizmaster of the show was Nikhil Kurien Jacob. The tagline of the Quiz Society is "It's all about Quizzing."

Community radio station
Puduvai Vaani, the community radio station (CRS) established by Pondicherry University with the support of UGC located in National Capital Territory of Delhi, India. It works under FM 107.8 MHz a frequency which is currently extended to a catchments area of  radius from the university campus. The test transmission of Puduvai Vaani – Community Radio Station was started on 23 August 2008. This was yet another initiative by Prof J. A. K. Tareen. It was inaugurated by Shri V. Narayanasamy, Hon’ble Union Minister of State for Planning & Parliamentary Affairs on 27 December 2008 in the presence of Shri P.Chidambaram, Hon’ble Union Home Minister. The full-time transmission started on 1 January 2009.

Silver Jubilee celebrations

The valedictory of the silver jubilee celebrations of Pondicherry University was held on 18 October 2010. Dr C Rangarajan, Chairman of the Economic Advisory Council to the Prime Minister of India, delivered the keynote address. Lieutenant governor of Puducherry, Iqbal Singh, who was the Chief Rector of the university, was present at the function. Professor J. A. K. Tareen, Vice Chancellor presided over the function.

Notable alumni
 Kodiyeri Balakrishnan, Former Home Minister of Kerala
 N. Rangaswamy, 9th Chief Minister of Puducherry
 Jayanthasri Balakrishnan, Public speaker and retired professor 
 Elango Kumaravel, Actor 
 Babu Gogineni, Humanist, Rationalist 
 Kesava Reddy, Writer 
 Durai Sundar, Indian Computational Biologist 
 Lijomol Jose, Indian Actress
 Jijoy Rajagopal, Actor 
 Ma Ka Pa Anand, Actor 
 Anu Antony, Actress
 Arulnithi, Actor 
 Fathima Babu, Actress 
 Rona Wilson, Activist 
 Ragy Thomas, CEO of Sprinklr
 Majiziya Bhanu, Indian Body Builder & Dental Surgeon 
 Pondy Ravi, Actor 
 Sushrut Badhe, Author & Researcher 
 Pramod Payyannur, Malayalam Theaterer
 Ramesh Parambath, Member of Puducherry Legislative Assembly 
 Murugabhoopathy, playwrighter
 J. Prakash Kumar, Member of Puducherry Legislative Assembly
 Vaseem Iqbal, PhD holder
 R. B. Ashok Babu, Member of Puducherry Legislative Assembly

In popular culture
 Swapnakoodu
 Ivar Vivahitharayal

See also
Puducherry Technological University 
National Institute of Technology Puducherry
Jawaharlal Institute of Postgraduate Medical Education and Research

References

External links

 
Central universities in India
Universities in Puducherry
Educational institutions established in 1985
1985 establishments in Pondicherry